Nathan Toman is an American politician who, as of 2017, serves in the North Dakota House of Representatives.

References

Living people
Bismarck State College alumni
Republican Party members of the North Dakota House of Representatives
Date of birth missing (living people)
Year of birth missing (living people)
21st-century American politicians